Outrageous Fortune is a New Zealand comedy-drama television series that premiered on 12 July 2005 and concluded on 9 November 2010 on TV3 in New Zealand. 107 episodes of Outrageous Fortune aired over the course of six series'. All six series' have been released on DVD in Region 4.

The series follows the lives of the Wests, a family of petty criminals living in West Auckland, New Zealand. Mother Cheryl (Robyn Malcolm) is the family matriarch, desperately trying to keep her family out of trouble, who decides to put an end to their criminal ways and become respectable citizens, when her husband Wolf (Grant Bowler) is sent to jail for four years. This is met with much resistance from twin sons Van and Jethro (Antony Starr), older daughter Pascalle (Siobhan Marshall), younger daughter Loretta (Antonia Prebble), and father-in-law Ted (Frank Whitten).

Each episode title is a quotation from Hamlet.

Series overview

Episode list

Series 1 (2005) 
The first series opens with the introduction of the Wests, known far and wide as a small-time crime family. When patriarch Wolf is sent to prison for four years, his wife Cheryl decides that she wants better for her children and tells the family that they're all going legit from now on. However, she finds that it's not easy making an honest buck in this world, and the rest of the family must fight their natural instincts to stay on the straight and narrow, especially when Wolf is still pulling the strings from inside.

Series 2 (2006) 
The second series picks up the story of the West family and their attempts to stay out of trouble, but one major thing has changed: Wolf is out of prison and on home detention. And he, for one, never bought into Cheryl's grand plan for his family. Cheryl must deal with constant opposition from her husband Wolf to stay straight. Although she deals with the occasional temptation to veer from her chosen path, Cheryl leads by example and tries to keep her family on the same track.

Special (2006)

Series 3 (2007) 
The third series sees West family matriarch Cheryl still battling to keep her family (and herself) on the straight and narrow. Both the men in her life are inside, Wolf, after turning himself into the cops as part of his master plan to frame Judd; Judd, because he fell in love with the wrong woman. As Cheryl ploughs on regardless, balancing the needs of family with those of Hoochie Mama, her burgeoning naughty knicker business, her offspring are going their own merry ways. Van is still managing the Lucky Dollar Store and planning his dream wedding with Aurora Bay (Claire Chitham). Jethro is branching out from defending the scum of the Earth (and his family) to working for property developer Gary Savage (Aaron Jeffery). Pascalle is enthusiastically embracing both her new-found vocation in caring for the elderly and her new-found love for Dr. Bruce Khan (Jacob Rajan). Loretta is happily ensconced with her older man, Hayden Peters (Shane Cortese), and is gleefully plotting her directorial debut, helming the next great erotic film, especially for women.

Series 4 (2008)

Series 5 (2009) 
The fifth series begins with the aftermath of Ted's fateful wedding day. Newly pregnant Cheryl and boyfriend Wayne Judd must adapt to the ever-changing family dynamic. Van gets the short end of the stick during a raid on the West house. But it isn't a West that newcomer, Detective Sergeant Zane Gerard (Charles Mesure) is after. Sheree Greegan (Tyler-Jane Mitchel) is arrested instead for robbery, after trying to acquire cash for her unborn babies. However, it turns out Gerard is not after Sheree, but instead has a personal vendetta against her brother, Nicky Greegan (Craig Hall). He's doing whatever it takes to put Nicky behind bars, including blackmailing Van to give up information regarding Nicky. Meanwhile, Loretta hooks up with her brother Jethro and her ex-boyfriend Hayden, with whom she had a child, Jane. They conspire to sell a newly manufactured drug named Excellence, before it becomes illegal.

Series 6 (2010) 
John Campbell appeared as himself in a small cameo in "What a Rash and Bloody Deed Is This".

References

External links
 
 
  at South Pacific Pictures
 

Lists of comedy-drama television series episodes
Lists of New Zealand television series episodes

es:Outrageous Fortune
sv:Outrageous Fortune